Matteo Muccignat (Pordenone, 8 August 1985) is a retired Italian rugby union player. His usual position was as a Prop and he played for Valorugby Emilia in Top12.

Until 2015–16 Pro12 season he played for Benetton Treviso.

In 2010 Muccignat was also named in the Italy A squad for 2010 IRB Nations Cup.

References

External links 
It's Rugby France Profile
Eurosport Profile

People from Pordenone
Italian rugby union players
1985 births
Living people
Rugby union props
Sportspeople from Friuli-Venezia Giulia